

Events

Pre-1600
69 – Tiberius Julius Alexander orders his Roman legions in Alexandria to swear allegiance to Vespasian as Emperor.
 552 – Battle of Taginae: Byzantine forces under Narses defeat the Ostrogoths in Italy, and the Ostrogoth king, Totila, is mortally wounded.
1097 – Battle of Dorylaeum: Crusaders led by prince Bohemond of Taranto defeat a Seljuk army led by sultan Kilij Arslan I.
1431 – The Battle of La Higueruela takes place in Granada, leading to a modest advance of the Kingdom of Castile during the Reconquista.
1520 – Spanish conquistadors led by Hernán Cortés fight their way out of Tenochtitlan after nightfall.
1523 – Jan van Essen and Hendrik Vos become the first Lutheran martyrs, burned at the stake by Roman Catholic authorities in Brussels.
1569 – Union of Lublin: The Kingdom of Poland and the Grand Duchy of Lithuania confirm a real union; the united country is called the Polish–Lithuanian Commonwealth or the Republic of Both Nations.

1601–1900
1643 – First meeting of the Westminster Assembly, a council of theologians ("divines") and members of the Parliament of England appointed to restructure the Church of England, at Westminster Abbey in London.
1690 – War of the Grand Alliance: Marshal de Luxembourg triumphs over an Anglo-Dutch army at the battle of Fleurus.
1690 – Glorious Revolution: Battle of the Boyne in Ireland (as reckoned under the Julian calendar).
1766 – François-Jean de la Barre, a young French nobleman, is tortured and beheaded before his body is burnt on a pyre along with a copy of Voltaire's Dictionnaire philosophique nailed to his torso for the crime of not saluting a Roman Catholic religious procession in Abbeville, France.
1782 – Raid on Lunenburg: American privateers attack the British settlement of Lunenburg, Nova Scotia.
1819 – Johann Georg Tralles discovers the Great Comet of 1819, (C/1819 N1). It is the first comet analyzed using polarimetry, by François Arago.
1823 – The five Central American nations of Guatemala, El Salvador, Honduras, Nicaragua, and Costa Rica declare independence from the First Mexican Empire after being annexed the year prior.
1837 – A system of civil registration of births, marriages and deaths is established in England and Wales.
1855 – Signing of the Quinault Treaty: The Quinault and the Quileute cede their land to the United States.
1858 – Joint reading of Charles Darwin and Alfred Russel Wallace's papers on evolution to the Linnean Society of London.
1862 – The Russian State Library is founded as the Library of the Moscow Public Museum.
  1862   – Princess Alice of the United Kingdom, second daughter of Queen Victoria, marries Prince Louis of Hesse, the future Louis IV, Grand Duke of Hesse.
  1862   – American Civil War: The Battle of Malvern Hill takes place. It is the last of the Seven Days Battles, part of George B. McClellan's Peninsula Campaign.
1863 – Keti Koti (Emancipation Day) in Suriname, marking the abolition of slavery by the Netherlands.
  1863   – American Civil War: The Battle of Gettysburg begins.
1867 – The British North America Act takes effect as the Province of Canada, New Brunswick and Nova Scotia join into confederation to create the modern nation of Canada. John A. Macdonald is sworn in as the first Prime Minister of Canada. This date is commemorated annually in Canada as Canada Day, a national holiday.
1870 – The United States Department of Justice formally comes into existence.
1873 – Prince Edward Island joins into Canadian Confederation.
1874 – The Sholes and Glidden typewriter, the first commercially successful typewriter, goes on sale.
1878 – Canada joins the Universal Postal Union.
1879 – Charles Taze Russell publishes the first edition of the religious magazine The Watchtower.
1881 – The world's first international telephone call is made between St. Stephen, New Brunswick, Canada, and Calais, Maine, United States.
  1881   – General Order 70, the culmination of the Cardwell and Childers reforms of the British Army, comes into effect.
1885 – The United States terminates reciprocity and fishery agreement with Canada.
  1885   – The Congo Free State is established by King Leopold II of Belgium.
1890 – Canada and Bermuda are linked by telegraph cable.
1898 – Spanish–American War: The Battle of San Juan Hill is fought in Santiago de Cuba, Cuba.

1901–present
1901 – French government enacts its anti-clerical legislation Law of Association prohibiting the formation of new monastic orders without governmental approval.
1903 – Start of first Tour de France bicycle race.
1908 – SOS is adopted as the international distress signal.
1911 – Germany despatches the gunship  to Morocco, sparking the Agadir Crisis.
1915 – Leutnant Kurt Wintgens of the then-named German Deutsches Heer's Fliegertruppe army air service achieves the first known aerial victory with a synchronized machine-gun armed fighter plane, the Fokker M.5K/MG Eindecker.
1916 – World War I: First day on the Somme: On the first day of the Battle of the Somme 19,000 soldiers of the British Army are killed and 40,000 wounded.
1917 – Chinese General Zhang Xun seizes control of Beijing and restores the monarchy, installing Puyi, last emperor of the Qing dynasty, to the throne. The restoration is reversed just shy of two weeks later, when Republican troops regain control of the capital.
1921 – The Chinese Communist Party is founded by Chen Duxiu and Li Dazhao, with the help of the Far Eastern Bureau of the Russian Social Democratic Labour Party (Bolsheviks), who seized power in Russia after the 1917 October Revolution, and the Far Eastern Secretariat of the Communist International.
1922 – The Great Railroad Strike of 1922 begins in the United States.
1923 – The Parliament of Canada suspends all Chinese immigration.
1931 – United Airlines begins service (as Boeing Air Transport).
  1931   – Wiley Post and Harold Gatty become the first people to circumnavigate the globe in a single-engined monoplane aircraft.
1932 – Australia's national broadcaster, the Australian Broadcasting Corporation, was formed.
1935 – Regina, Saskatchewan police and Royal Canadian Mounted Police ambush strikers participating in the On-to-Ottawa Trek.
1942 – World War II: First Battle of El Alamein.
  1942   – The Australian Federal Government becomes the sole collector of income tax in Australia as State Income Tax is abolished.
1943 – The City of Tokyo and the Prefecture of Tokyo are both replaced by the Tokyo Metropolis.
1946 – Crossroads Able is the first postwar nuclear weapon test.
1947 – The Philippine Air Force is established.
1948 – Muhammad Ali Jinnah (Quaid-i-Azam) inaugurates Pakistan's central bank, the State Bank of Pakistan.
1949 – The merger of two princely states of India, Cochin and Travancore, into the state of Thiru-Kochi (later re-organized as Kerala) in the Indian Union ends more than 1,000 years of princely rule by the Cochin royal family.
1957 – The International Geophysical Year begins.
1958 – The Canadian Broadcasting Corporation links television broadcasting across Canada via microwave.
  1958   – Flooding of Canada's Saint Lawrence Seaway begins.
1959 – Specific values for the international yard, avoirdupois pound and derived units (e.g. inch, mile and ounce) are adopted after agreement between the US, the United Kingdom and other Commonwealth countries.
1960 – The Trust Territory of Somaliland (the former Italian Somaliland) gains its independence from Italy. Concurrently, it unites as scheduled with the five-day-old State of Somaliland (the former British Somaliland) to form the Somali Republic.
  1960   – Ghana becomes a republic and Kwame Nkrumah becomes its first President as Queen Elizabeth II ceases to be its head of state.
1962 – Independence of Rwanda and Burundi.
1963 – ZIP codes are introduced for United States mail.
  1963   – The British Government admits that former diplomat Kim Philby had worked as a Soviet agent.
1966 – The first color television transmission in Canada takes place from Toronto.
1967 – Merger Treaty: The European Community is formally created out of a merger between the Common Market, the European Coal and Steel Community, and the European Atomic Energy Commission.
1968 – The United States Central Intelligence Agency's Phoenix Program is officially established.
  1968   – The Treaty on the Non-Proliferation of Nuclear Weapons is signed in Washington, D.C., London and Moscow by sixty-two countries.
  1968   – Formal separation of the United Auto Workers from the AFL–CIO in the United States.
1972 – The first Gay pride march in England takes place.
1976 – Portugal grants autonomy to Madeira.
1978 – The Northern Territory in Australia is granted self-government.
1979 – Sony introduces the Walkman.
1980 – "O Canada" officially becomes the national anthem of Canada.
1983 – A North Korean Ilyushin Il-62M jet en route to Conakry Airport in Guinea crashes into the Fouta Djallon mountains in Guinea-Bissau, killing all 23 people on board.
1983 – The Ministry of State Security is established as China's principal intelligence agency
1984 – The PG-13 rating is introduced by the MPAA.
1987 – The American radio station WFAN in New York City is launched as the world's first all-sports radio station.
1990 – German reunification: East Germany accepts the Deutsche Mark as its currency, thus uniting the economies of East and West Germany.
1991 – Cold War: The Warsaw Pact is officially dissolved at a meeting in Prague.
1997 – China resumes sovereignty over the city-state of Hong Kong, ending 156 years of British colonial rule.  The handover ceremony is attended by British Prime Minister Tony Blair, Charles, Prince of Wales, Chinese President Jiang Zemin and U.S. Secretary of State Madeleine Albright.
1999 – The Scottish Parliament is officially opened by Elizabeth II on the day that legislative powers are officially transferred from the old Scottish Office in London to the new devolved Scottish Executive in Edinburgh. In Wales, the powers of the Welsh Secretary are transferred to the National Assembly.
2002 – The International Criminal Court is established to prosecute individuals for genocide, crimes against humanity, war crimes and the crime of aggression.
  2002 – Bashkirian Airlines Flight 2937, a Tupolev Tu-154, and DHL Flight 611, a Boeing 757, collide in mid-air over Überlingen, southern Germany, killing all 71 on board both planes.
2003 – Over 500,000 people protest against efforts to pass anti-sedition legislation in Hong Kong.
2004 – Saturn orbit insertion of Cassini–Huygens begins at 01:12 UTC and ends at 02:48 UTC.
2006 – The first operation of Qinghai–Tibet Railway is conducted in China.
2007 – Smoking in England is banned in all public indoor spaces.
2008 – Riots erupt in Mongolia in response to allegations of fraud surrounding the 2008 legislative elections.
2013 – Croatia becomes the 28th member of the European Union.
2020 – The United States–Mexico–Canada Agreement replaces NAFTA.

Births

Pre-1600
1311 – Liu Bowen, Chinese military strategist, statesman and poet (d. 1375)
1464 – Clara Gonzaga, Italian noble (d. 1503)
1481 – Christian II of Denmark (d. 1559)
1506 – Louis II of Hungary (d. 1526)
1534 – Frederick II of Denmark (d. 1588)
1553 – Peter Street, English carpenter and builder (d. 1609)
1574 – Joseph Hall, English bishop and mystic (d. 1656)
1586 – Claudio Saracini, Italian lute player and composer (d. 1630)

1601–1900
1633 – Johann Heinrich Heidegger, Swiss theologian and author (d. 1698)
1646 – Gottfried Wilhelm Leibniz, German mathematician and philosopher (d. 1716)
1663 – Franz Xaver Murschhauser, German composer and theorist (d. 1738)
1725 – Rhoda Delaval, English painter and aristocrat (d. 1757)
  1725   – Jean-Baptiste Donatien de Vimeur, comte de Rochambeau, French general (d. 1807)
1726 – Acharya Bhikshu, Jain saint (d. 1803)
1731 – Adam Duncan, 1st Viscount Duncan, Scottish-English admiral (d. 1804)
1742 – Georg Christoph Lichtenberg, German physicist and academic (d. 1799)
1771 – Ferdinando Paer, Italian composer and conductor (d. 1839)
1788 – Jean-Victor Poncelet, French mathematician and engineer (d. 1867)
1804 – Charles Gordon Greene, American journalist and politician (d. 1886)
  1804   – George Sand, French author and playwright (d. 1876)
1807 – Thomas Green Clemson, American politician and educator, founder of Clemson University (d. 1888)
1808 – Ygnacio del Valle, Mexican-American landowner (d. 1880)
1814 – Robert Richard Torrens, Irish-Australian politician, 3rd Premier of South Australia (d. 1884)
1818 – Ignaz Semmelweis, Hungarian-Austrian physician and obstetrician (d. 1865)
  1818   – Karl von Vierordt, German physician, psychologist and academic (d. 1884)
1822 – Nguyễn Đình Chiểu, Vietnamese poet and activist (d. 1888)
1834 – Jadwiga Łuszczewska, Polish poet and author (d. 1908)
1850 – Florence Earle Coates, American poet (d. 1927)
1858 – Willard Metcalf, American painter (d. 1925)
  1858   – Velma Caldwell Melville, American editor and writer of prose and poetry (d. 1924)
1863 – William Grant Stairs, Canadian-English captain and explorer (d. 1892)
1869 – William Strunk Jr., American author and educator (d. 1946)
1872 – Louis Blériot, French pilot and engineer (d. 1936)
  1872   – William Duddell, English physicist and engineer (d. 1917)
1873 – Alice Guy-Blaché, French-American film director, producer and screenwriter (d. 1968)
  1873   – Andrass Samuelsen, Faroese politician, 1st Prime Minister of the Faroe Islands (d. 1954)
1875 – Joseph Weil, American con man (d. 1976)
1876 – T. J. Ryan, Australian politician, 19th Premier of Queensland (d. 1921)
1878 – Jacques Rosenbaum, Estonian-German architect (d. 1944)
1879 – Léon Jouhaux, French union leader, Nobel Prize laureate (d. 1954)
1881 – Edward Battersby Bailey, English geologist (d. 1965)
1882 – Bidhan Chandra Roy, Indian physician and politician, 2nd Chief Minister of West Bengal (d. 1962)
1883 – Arthur Borton, English colonel, Victoria Cross recipient (d. 1933)
1885 – Dorothea Mackellar, Australian author and poet (d. 1968)
1887 – Amber Reeves, New Zealand-English author and scholar (d. 1981)
1892 – James M. Cain, American author and journalist (d. 1977)
  1892   – László Lajtha, Hungarian composer and conductor (d. 1963)
1899 – Thomas A. Dorsey, American pianist and composer (d. 1993)
  1899   – Charles Laughton, English-American actor and director (d. 1962)
  1899   – Konstantinos Tsatsos, Greek scholar and politician, President of Greece (d. 1987)

1901–present
1901 – Irna Phillips, American screenwriter (d. 1973)
1902 – William Wyler, French-American film director, producer and screenwriter (d. 1981)
1903 – Amy Johnson, English pilot (d. 1941)
  1903   – Beatrix Lehmann, English actress (d. 1979)
1906 – Jean Dieudonné, French mathematician and academic (d. 1992)
  1906   – Estée Lauder, American businesswoman, co-founder of Estée Lauder Companies (d. 2004)
1907 – Norman Pirie, Scottish-English biochemist and virologist (d. 1997)
1909 – Emmett Toppino, American sprinter (d. 1971)
1910 – Glenn Hardin, American hurdler (d. 1975)
1911 – Arnold Alas, Estonian landscape architect and artist (d. 1990) 
  1911   – Sergey Sokolov, Russian marshal and politician, Soviet Minister of Defence (d. 2012)
1912 – David Brower, American environmentalist, founder of the Sierra Club Foundation (d. 2000)
  1912   – Sally Kirkland, American journalist (d. 1989)
1913 – Frank Barrett, American baseball player (d. 1998)
  1913   – Lee Guttero, American basketball player (d. 2004)
  1913   – Vasantrao Naik, Indian politician, 3rd Chief Minister of Maharashtra (d. 1979)
1914 – Thomas Pearson, British Army officer (d. 2019)
  1914   – Christl Cranz, German alpine skier (d. 2004)
  1914   – Bernard B. Wolfe, American politician (d. 2016)
1915 – Willie Dixon, American blues singer-songwriter, bass player, guitarist and producer (d. 1992)
  1915   – Philip Lever, 3rd Viscount Leverhulme, British peer (d. 2000)
  1915   – Boots Poffenberger, American baseball pitcher (d. 1999)
  1915   – Joseph Ransohoff, American soldier and neurosurgeon (d. 2001)
  1915   – Nguyễn Văn Linh, Vietnamese politician (d. 1998)
1916 – Olivia de Havilland, British-American actress (d. 2020) 
  1916   – Iosif Shklovsky, Ukrainian astronomer and astrophysicist (d. 1985)
  1916   – George C. Stoney, American director and producer (d. 2012)
1917 – Humphry Osmond, English-American lieutenant and psychiatrist (d. 2004)
  1917   – Álvaro Domecq y Díez, Spanish aristocrat (d. 2005)
1918 – Ralph Young, American singer and actor (d. 2008)
  1918   – Ahmed Deedat, South African writer and public speaker (d. 2005)
  1918   – Pedro Yap, Filipino lawyer (d. 2003)
1919 – Arnold Meri, Estonian colonel (d. 2009)
  1919   – Malik Dohan al-Hassan, Iraqi politician (d. 2021)
  1919   – Gerald E. Miller, American vice admiral (d. 2014)
1920 – Henri Amouroux, French historian and journalist (d. 2007)
  1920   – Harold Sakata, Japanese-American wrestler and actor (d. 1982)
  1920   – George I. Fujimoto, American-Japanese chemist
1921 – Seretse Khama, Batswana lawyer and politician, 1st President of Botswana (d. 1980)
  1921   – Michalina Wisłocka, Polish gynecologist and sexologist (d. 2005)
  1921   – Arthur Johnson, Canadian canoeist (d. 2003)
1922 – Toshi Seeger, German-American activist, co-founder of the Clearwater Festival (d. 2013)
  1922   – Mordechai Bibi, Israeli politician (d. 2023)
1923 – Scotty Bowers, American marine, author and pimp (d. 2019)
1924 – Antoni Ramallets, Spanish footballer and manager (d. 2013)
  1924   – Florence Stanley, American actress (d. 2003)
  1924   – Georges Rivière, French actor
1925 – Farley Granger, American actor (d. 2011)
  1925   – Art McNally, American football referee (d. 2023)
1926 – Robert Fogel, American economist and academic, Nobel Prize laureate (d. 2013)
  1926   – Carl Hahn, German businessman (d. 2023)
  1926   – Mohamed Abshir Muse, Somali general (d. 2017)
  1926   – Hans Werner Henze, German composer and educator (d. 2012)
1927 – Alan J. Charig, English paleontologist and author (d. 1997)
  1927   – Winfield Dunn, American politician, 43rd Governor of Tennessee
  1927   – Joseph Martin Sartoris, American bishop
  1927   – Chandra Shekhar, 8th Prime Minister of India (d. 2007)
1929 – Gerald Edelman, American biologist and  immunologist, Nobel Prize laureate (d. 2014)
1930 – Moustapha Akkad, Syrian-American director and producer (d. 2005)
  1930   – Carol Chomsky, American linguist and academic (d. 2008)
1931 – Leslie Caron, French actress and dancer
1932 – Ze'ev Schiff, French-Israeli journalist and author (d. 2007)
1933 – C. Scott Littleton, American anthropologist and academic (d. 2010)
1934 – Claude Berri, French actor, director and screenwriter (d. 2009)
  1934   – Jamie Farr, American actor 
  1934   – Jean Marsh, English actress and screenwriter
  1934   – Sydney Pollack, American actor, director and producer (d. 2008)
1935 – James Cotton, American singer-songwriter and harmonica player (d. 2017)
  1935   – David Prowse, English actor (d. 2020)
1936 – Wally Amos, American entrepreneur, founder of Famous Amos
1938 – Craig Anderson, American baseball player and coach
  1938   – Hariprasad Chaurasia, Indian flute player and composer
1939 – Karen Black, American actress (d. 2013)
  1939   – Delaney Bramlett, American singer-songwriter, guitarist and producer (d. 2008)
1940 – Craig Brown, Scottish footballer and manager
  1940   – Ela Gandhi, South African activist and politician
  1940   – Cahit Zarifoğlu, Turkish poet and author (d. 1987)
1941 – Rod Gilbert, Canadian-American ice hockey player (d. 2021)
  1941   – Alfred G. Gilman, American pharmacologist and biochemist, Nobel Prize laureate (d. 2015)
  1941   – Nicolae Saramandu, Romanian linguist and philologist
  1941   – Myron Scholes, Canadian-American economist and academic, Nobel Prize laureate
  1941   – Twyla Tharp, American dancer and choreographer
1942 – Izzat Ibrahim al-Douri, Iraqi field marshal and politician (d. 2020)
  1942   – Geneviève Bujold, Canadian actress
  1942   – Andraé Crouch, American singer-songwriter, producer and pastor (d. 2015)
  1942   – Julia Higgins, English chemist and academic
1943 – Philip Brunelle, American conductor and organist
  1943   – Peeter Lepp, Estonian politician, 37th Mayor of Tallinn
  1943   – Jeff Wayne, American composer, musician and lyricist
1944 – Nurul Haque Miah, Bangladeshi professor and writer (d. 2021)
1945 – Mike Burstyn, American actor and singer
  1945   – Debbie Harry, American singer-songwriter and actress 
1946 – Mick Aston, English archaeologist and academic (d. 2013)
  1946   – Erkki Tuomioja, Finnish sergeant and politician, Finnish Minister for Foreign Affairs
  1946   – Kojo Laing, Ghanaian novelist and poet (d. 2017)
1947 – Kazuyoshi Hoshino, Japanese race car driver
  1947   – Malcolm Wicks, English academic and politician (d. 2012)
1948 – John Ford, English-American singer-songwriter and guitarist 
1949 – Néjia Ben Mabrouk, Tunisian-Belgian director and screenwriter
  1949   – John Farnham, English-Australian singer-songwriter 
  1949   – David Hogan, American composer and educator (d. 1996)
  1949   – Venkaiah Naidu, Indian lawyer and politician 
1950 – David Duke, American white supremacist, politician and Ku Klux Klan Grand Wizard
1951 – Trevor Eve, English actor and producer
  1951   – Anne Feeney, American singer-songwriter and activist (d. 2021)
  1951   – Julia Goodfellow, English physicist and academic
  1951   – Klaus-Peter Justus, German runner
  1951   – Tom Kozelko, American basketball player
  1951   – Terrence Mann, American actor, singer and dancer
  1951   – Fred Schneider, American singer-songwriter and keyboard player 
  1951   – Victor Willis, American singer-songwriter, pianist and actor 
1952 – Dan Aykroyd, Canadian actor, producer and screenwriter
  1952   – David Arkenstone, American composer and performer
  1952   – David Lane, English oncologist and academic
  1952   – Steve Shutt, Canadian ice hockey player and sportscaster
  1952   – Timothy J. Tobias, American pianist and composer (d. 2006)
1953 – Lawrence Gonzi, Maltese lawyer and politician, 12th Prime Minister of Malta
  1953   – Jadranka Kosor, Croatian journalist and politician, 9th Prime Minister of Croatia
1954 – Keith Whitley, American singer and guitarist (d. 1989)
1954 – Hossein Nuri, Iranian artist and director
1955 – Nikolai Demidenko, Russian pianist and educator
  1955   – Li Keqiang, Chinese economist and politician, 7th Premier of the People's Republic of China
  1955   – Lisa Scottoline, American lawyer and author
  1955   – Maʻafu Tukuiʻaulahi, Tongan politician and military officer, Deputy Prime Minister (d. 2021)
1957 – Lisa Blount, American actress and producer (d. 2010)
  1957   – Hannu Kamppuri, Finnish ice hockey player
  1957   – Sean O'Driscoll, English footballer and manager
1958 – Jack Dyer Crouch II, American diplomat, United States Deputy National Security Advisor
1960 – Michael Beattie, Australian rugby league player and coach
  1960   – Lynn Jennings, American runner
  1960   – Evelyn "Champagne" King, American soul/disco singer 
  1960   – Kevin Swords, American rugby player
1961 – Malcolm Elliott, English cyclist
  1961   – Ivan Kaye, English actor
  1961   – Carl Lewis, American long jumper and runner
  1961   – Diana, Princess of Wales (d. 1997)
  1961   – Michelle Wright, Canadian singer-songwriter and guitarist
1962 – Andre Braugher, American actor and producer
  1962   – Mokhzani Mahathir, Malaysian businessman
1963 – Roddy Bottum, American singer and keyboard player 
  1963   – Nick Giannopoulos, Australian actor
  1963   – David Wood, American lawyer and environmentalist (d. 2006)
1964 – Bernard Laporte, French rugby player and coach
1965 – Carl Fogarty, English motorcycle racer
  1965   – Garry Schofield, English rugby player and coach
  1965   – Harald Zwart, Norwegian director and producer
1966 – Enrico Annoni, Italian footballer and coach
  1966   – Shawn Burr, Canadian-American ice hockey player (d. 2013)
1967 – Pamela Anderson, Canadian-American model and actress
1969 – Séamus Egan, American-Irish singer-songwriter and guitarist 
1971 – Missy Elliott, American rapper, producer, dancer and actress
  1971   – Julianne Nicholson, American actress
1974 – Jefferson Pérez, Ecuadorian race walker
1975 – Sean Colson, American basketball player and coach
  1975   – Sufjan Stevens, American singer-songwriter and guitarist 
1976 – Patrick Kluivert, Dutch footballer and coach
  1976   – Hannu Tihinen, Finnish footballer
  1976   – Albert Torrens, Australian rugby league player
  1976   – Ruud van Nistelrooy, Dutch footballer and manager
  1976   – Szymon Ziółkowski, Polish hammer thrower
1977 – Tom Frager, Senegalese-French singer-songwriter and guitarist
  1977   – Keigo Hayashi, Japanese musician
  1977   – Jarome Iginla, Canadian ice hockey player
  1977   – Liv Tyler, American actress
1979 – Forrest Griffin, American mixed martial artist and actor
1980 – Nelson Cruz, Dominican-American baseball player
1981 – Carlo Del Fava, South African-Italian rugby player
  1981   – Tadhg Kennelly, Irish-Australian footballer
1982 – Justin Huber, Australian baseball player
  1982   – Joachim Johansson, Swedish tennis player
  1982   – Adrian Ward, American football player
  1982   – Hilarie Burton, American actress
1983 – Leeteuk, South Korean singer and entertainer
1984 – Donald Thomas, Bahamian high jumper
1985 – Chris Perez, American baseball player
1986 – Charlie Blackmon, American baseball player
  1986   – Andrew Lee, Australian footballer
  1986   – Julian Prochnow, German footballer
1987 – Michael Schrader, German decathlete
1988 – Dedé, Brazilian footballer
  1988   – Aleksander Lesun, Russian modern pentathlete
1989 – Kent Bazemore, American basketball player
  1989   – Daniel Ricciardo, Australian race car driver
1990 – Ben Coker, English footballer
1991 – Michael Wacha, American baseball player
1992 – Aaron Sanchez, American baseball player
1994 – Chloé Paquet, French tennis player
1995 – Boli Bolingoli-Mbombo, Belgian footballer
  1995   – Savvy Shields, Miss America 2017
1996 – Adelina Sotnikova, Russian figure skater
1998 – Susan Bandecchi, Swiss tennis player
1998 – Aleksandra Golovkina, Lithuanian figure skater
2000 – Lalu Muhammad Zohri, Indonesian sprinter
2001 – Chosen Jacobs, American entertainer
2003 – Tate McRae, Canadian singer-songwriter and dancer

Deaths

Pre-1600
 552 – Totila, Ostrogoth king
 992 – Heonjeong, Korean queen (b. 966)
1109 – Alfonso VI, king of León and Castile (b. 1040)
1224 – Hōjō Yoshitoki, regent of the Kamakura shogunate of Japan (b. 1163)
1242 – Chagatai Khan, Mongol ruler (b. 1183)
1277 – Baibars, Egyptian sultan (b. 1223)
1287 – Narathihapate, Burmese king (b. 1238)
1321 – María de Molina, queen of Castile and León
1348 – Joan, English princess
1555 – John Bradford, English reformer, prebendary of St. Paul's (b. 1510)
1589 – Lady Saigō, Japanese concubine (b. 1552)
1592 – Marc'Antonio Ingegneri, Italian composer and educator (b. 1535)

1601–1900
1614 – Isaac Casaubon, French philologist and scholar (b. 1559)
1622 – William Parker, 4th Baron Monteagle, English politician (b. 1575)
1681 – Oliver Plunkett, Irish archbishop and saint (b. 1629)
1736 – Ahmed III, Ottoman sultan (b. 1673)
1749 – William Jones, Welsh mathematician and academic (b. 1675)
1774 – Henry Fox, 1st Baron Holland, English politician, Secretary of State for the Southern Department (b. 1705)
1782 – Charles Watson-Wentworth, 2nd Marquess of Rockingham, English admiral and politician, Prime Minister of Great Britain (b. 1730)
1784 – Wilhelm Friedemann Bach, German organist and composer (b. 1710)
1787 – Charles de Rohan, French marshal (b. 1715)
1819 – The Public Universal Friend, American evangelist (b. 1752)
1839 – Mahmud II, Ottoman sultan (b. 1785)
1860 – Charles Goodyear, American chemist and engineer (b. 1800)
1863 – John F. Reynolds, American general (b. 1820)
1884 – Allan Pinkerton, Scottish-American detective and spy (b. 1819)
1896 – Harriet Beecher Stowe, American author and activist (b. 1811)

1901–present
1905 – John Hay, American journalist and politician, 37th United States Secretary of State (b. 1838)
1912 – Harriet Quimby, American pilot and screenwriter (b. 1875) 
1925 – Erik Satie, French pianist and composer (b. 1866)
1934 – Ernst Röhm, German paramilitary commander (b. 1887)
1942 – Peadar Toner Mac Fhionnlaoich, Irish writer (b. 1857)
1943 – Willem Arondeus, Dutch artist, author and anti-Nazi resistance fighter (b. 1894)
1944 – Carl Mayer, Austrian-English screenwriter (b. 1894)
  1944   – Tanya Savicheva, Russian author (b. 1930)
1948 – Achille Varzi, Italian race car driver (b. 1904)
1950 – Émile Jaques-Dalcroze, Swiss composer and educator (b. 1865)
  1950   – Eliel Saarinen, Finnish-American architect, co-designed the National Museum of Finland (b. 1873)
1951 – Tadeusz Borowski, Polish poet, novelist and journalist (b. 1922)
1961 – Louis-Ferdinand Céline, French physician and author (b. 1894)
1962 – Purushottam Das Tandon, Indian lawyer and politician (b. 1882)
  1962   – Bidhan Chandra Roy, Indian physician and politician, 2nd Chief Minister of West Bengal (b. 1882)
1964 – Pierre Monteux, French-American viola player and conductor (b. 1875)
1965 – Wally Hammond, English cricketer (b. 1903)
  1965   – Robert Ruark, American journalist and author (b. 1915)
1966 – Frank Verner, American runner (b. 1883)
1967 – Gerhard Ritter, German historian and academic (b. 1888)
1968 – Fritz Bauer, German judge and politician (b. 1903)
1971 – William Lawrence Bragg, Australian-English physicist and academic, Nobel Prize laureate (b. 1890)
  1971   – Learie Constantine, Trinidadian-English cricketer, lawyer and politician (b. 1901)
1974 – Juan Perón, Argentinian general and politician, President of Argentina (b. 1895)
1978 – Kurt Student, German general and pilot (b. 1890)
1981 – Carlos de Oliveira, Portuguese author and poet (b. 1921)
1983 – Buckminster Fuller, American architect, designed the Montreal Biosphère (b. 1895)
1984 – Moshé Feldenkrais, Ukrainian-Israeli physicist and academic (b. 1904)
1990 – Jurriaan Schrofer, Dutch sculptor, designer and educator (b. 1926)
1991 – Michael Landon, American actor, director and producer (b. 1936)
1992 – Franco Cristaldi, Italian screenwriter and producer (b. 1924)
1994 – Merriam Modell, American author (b. 1908)
1995 – Wolfman Jack, American radio host (b. 1938)
  1995   – Ian Parkin, English guitarist (Be-Bop Deluxe) (b. 1950)
1996 – William T. Cahill, American lawyer and politician, 46th Governor of New Jersey (b. 1904)
  1996   – Margaux Hemingway, American model and actress (b. 1954)
  1996   – Steve Tesich, Serbian-American author and screenwriter (b. 1942)
1997 – Robert Mitchum, American actor (b. 1917)
  1997   – Charles Werner, American cartoonist (b. 1909)
1999 – Edward Dmytryk, Canadian-American director and producer (b. 1908)
  1999   – Forrest Mars Sr., American businessman, creator of M&M's and the Mars chocolate bar (b. 1904)
  1999   – Sylvia Sidney, American actress (b. 1910)
  1999   – Sola Sierra, Chilean human rights activist (b. 1935)
2000 – Walter Matthau, American actor (b. 1920)
2001 – Nikolay Basov, Russian physicist and academic, Nobel Prize laureate (b. 1922)
  2001   – Jean-Louis Rosier, French race car driver (b. 1925)
2003 – Herbie Mann, American flute player and saxophonist (b. 1930)
2004 – Peter Barnes, English playwright and screenwriter (b. 1931)
  2004   – Marlon Brando, American actor and director (b. 1924)
  2004   – Todor Skalovski, Macedonian composer and conductor (b. 1909)
2005 – Renaldo Benson, American singer-songwriter (Four Tops) (b. 1936)
  2005   – Gus Bodnar, Canadian ice hockey player and coach (b. 1923)
  2005   – Luther Vandross, American singer-songwriter and producer (Change) (b. 1951)
2006 – Ryutaro Hashimoto, Japanese politician, 53rd Prime Minister of Japan (b. 1937)
  2006   – Robert Lepikson, Estonian race car driver and politician, Estonian Minister of the Interior (b. 1952)
  2006   – Fred Trueman, English cricketer and sportscaster (b. 1931)
2008 – Mel Galley, English guitarist (b. 1948)
2009 – Karl Malden, American actor (b. 1912)
  2009   – Onni Palaste, Finnish soldier and author (b. 1917)
  2009   – Mollie Sugden, English actress (b. 1922)
2010 – Don Coryell, American football player and coach (b. 1924)
  2010   – Arnold Friberg, American painter and illustrator (b. 1913)
  2010   – Ilene Woods, American actress and singer (b. 1929)
2012 – Peter E. Gillquist, American priest and author (b. 1938)
  2012   – Ossie Hibbert, Jamaican-American keyboard player and producer (b. 1950)
  2012   – Evelyn Lear, American operatic soprano (b. 1926)
  2012   – Alan G. Poindexter, American captain, pilot and astronaut (b. 1961)
  2012   – Jack Richardson, American author and playwright (b. 1934)
2013 – Sidney Bryan Berry, American general (b. 1926)
  2013   – Charles Foley, American game designer, co-creator of Twister (b. 1930)
  2013   – William H. Gray, American minister and politician (b. 1941)
2014 – Jean Garon, Canadian economist, lawyer and politician (b. 1938)
  2014   – Stephen Gaskin, American activist, co-founder of The Farm (b. 1935)
  2014   – Bob Jones, English lawyer and politician (b. 1955)
  2014   – Anatoly Kornukov, Ukrainian-Russian general (b. 1942)
  2014   – Walter Dean Myers, American author and poet (b. 1937)
2015 – Val Doonican, Irish singer and television host (b. 1927)
  2015   – Czesław Olech, Polish mathematician and academic (b. 1931)
  2015   – Nicholas Winton, English lieutenant and humanitarian (b. 1909)
2016 – Robin Hardy, English author and film director (b. 1929)
2019 – Bogusław Schaeffer, Polish composer (b. 1929)
2021 – Louis Andriessen, Dutch composer (b. 1939)

Holidays and observances
Christian feast day:
Aaron (Syriac Christianity)
Blessed Antonio Rosmini-Serbati
Felix of Como
Junípero Serra
Julius and Aaron
Leontius of Autun
Servanus
Veep
July 1 (Eastern Orthodox liturgics)
Feast of the Most Precious Blood of Our Lord Jesus Christ (removed from official Roman Catholic calendar since 1969)
Earliest day on which Alexanderson Day can fall, celebrated on the Sunday closest to July 2. (Sweden)
Earliest day on which CARICOM Day can fall, celebrated on the first Monday of July. (Guyana)
Earliest day on which Constitution Day can fall, celebrated on the first Monday of July. (Cayman Islands)
Earliest day on which Día del Amigo can fall, celebrated on the first Saturday of July. (Peru)
Earliest day on which Fishermen's Holiday can fall, celebrated on the first Friday of July. (Marshall Islands)
Earliest day on which Heroes' Day can fall, celebrated on the first Monday of July. (Zambia)
Earliest day on which International Co-operative Day can fall, celebrated on the first Saturday of July.
Earliest day on which International Free Hugs Day can fall, celebrated on the first Saturday of July.
Earliest day on which Navy Day can fall, celebrated on the first Sunday of July. (Ukraine)
Earliest day on which Navy Days can fall, celebrated on the first Saturday and Sunday of July. (Netherlands)
Earliest day on which Youth Day can fall, celebrated on the first Sunday of July. (Singapore)
Armed Forces Day (Singapore) 
Bobby Bonilla Day (United States) 
Canada Day, formerly Dominion Day (Canada)
Children's Day (Pakistan)
Chinese Communist Party Founding Day (China)
Day of Officials and Civil Servants (Hungary)
Doctors' Day (India)
Emancipation Day (Sint Maarten and Sint Eustatius)
Engineer's Day (Bahrain, Mexico)
Hong Kong Special Administrative Region Establishment Day (Hong Kong, China)
Independence Day (Burundi), celebrates the independence of Burundi from Belgium in 1962.
Independence Day (Rwanda)
Independence Day (Somalia)
International Tartan Day 
July Morning (Bulgaria)
Keti Koti (Emancipation Day) (Suriname)
Madeira Day (Madeira, Portugal)
Moving Day (Quebec) (Canada)
Newfoundland and Labrador Memorial Day
Republic Day (Ghana)
Sir Seretse Khama Day (Botswana)
Territory Day (British Virgin Islands)
Territory Day (Northern Territory, Australia)
The first day of Van Mahotsav, celebrated until July 7. (India)

References

External links

 
 
 

Days of the year
July